Marie Drouet (born Marie-Ernestine Juillard in Chartèves on April 17, 1885 and died in Bétheny on November 19, 1963) was a French heroine of World War I.

Biography 
Born April 17, 1885, in Chartèves in the department of Aisne, she is the third daughter of Auguste Juillard and Victorine Marchand.

She married Charles Drouet on January 15, 1906, in Bétheny where she lived and ran a grocery store called “Le Pot-au-rouge” on Henri-Gand street.

In 1914, Marie Drouet's husband was at the front in Verdun. Despite her family charge of four children, she saves many wounded lying on the battlefields around Reims.

She died on November 19, 1963, in Bétheny, where she continued her job as a grocer.

WWI civil heroine 
Throughout the conflict, avoiding French and German encampments, she transported the wounded from the battlefield to the hospital using her plow and donkey. It also informed the French artillerymen on German positions by means of slips of paper displayed at her windows.

Suspected by the French secret service of working for the enemy, the order accompanying the captain who came to arrest her at her home exonerates her. He recognized the person who picked up the wounded, the incident was closed and Marie cleared.

It was during this period that she gave birth to her fifth child.

Legacy 
Marie received a medal from the city of Reims shortly after the Armistice, after which she fell into anonymity until her death in 1963. The month following her burial, an article in the newspaper  recounted her exploits. 

In 2014, still in the same newspaper, a second article was devoted to her on the occasion of the hundred years of the First World War. In April 2018, Val-de-Vesle dedicated a street to her. In September 2018, on the occasion of Heritage Days, the Association of Friends of Old Bétheny, organized an exhibition dedicated to her at the Bétheny museum to commemorate her rescue of many wounded. In 2018, during the commemorations of the Armistice of 11 November 1918, a tribute was paid to her in front of the monument to the dead of Bétheny.

References 

French women in World War I
1885 births
1963 deaths
People from Aisne
People from Marne (department)